The olive flounder (Paralichthys olivaceus), bastard halibut or Korean halibut, is a temperate marine species of large-tooth flounder native to the North-western Pacific Ocean.

It is often referred to as the Korean flatfish (광어) or Japanese flatfish when mentioned in the context of those countries. It is the highest valued finfish in the world, known to be excellent for aquaculture due to a rapid growth rate and popularity in Korea.

In 2017 its genome and transcriptome was sequenced as a model to study flatfish asymmetry.

Habitat and diet 
The olive flounder is often found in soft and muddy offshore, coastal areas where the water level goes down to 100 m in depth. The temperature of water in these areas range from 21- 24 °C or 69 -75 °F. Some flounder have been found in the Mariana Trench.

Olive flounder typically eat fish spawn, crustaceans, polychaetes, and small fish.

Life cycle 
Olive flounder spawn anytime from January through August  in shallow water, roughly about 70 cm in depth. The egg and larvae remain that way for about 24–50 days after hatching. Once they begin their metamorphosis process, they move towards more sandy areas and feed on shrimp. After achieving metamorphosis, the flounder move offshore and begin feeding on bigger fish in order to grow to their adult size.

How they become "flatfish" 
Olive flounder first start out upright like normal fish, but then after 24 to 50 days after hatching they turn onto their side. Their previous side now becomes their belly or their backside and then their eye and nostril move towards what is now considered the back. This process is typically called the "metamorphosis."

Aquaculture
The olive flounder is the most common flatfish species raised in aquaculture in Korea. They are raised in Japan and China as well. It is the most highly prized of the Japanese flounders. Although the aquaculture for the olive flounder started from the late 1980s, its commercial production didn't begin on a major scale until the 1990s in Korea.

Parasites and food poisoning 

The myxozoan Kudoa septemlineata has been described in 2010 from olive flounder from Korea. This microscopic parasite infects the trunk muscles of the olive flounder where it causes myoliquefaction. Ingestion of raw fish containing K. septemlineata spores has been reported as a cause of food poisoning (gastroenteritis) in Japan since 2003. However, laboratory studies performed in 2015 and 2016 on adult and suckling mice showed that K. septemlineata spores were excreted in faeces and did not affect the gastrointestinal tract.

Appearances in media
The olive flounder has appeared in the video game series Animal Crossing as one of the various fish species the player is able to catch using a fishing rod.

See also

References 

 Korea-US Aquaculture: Olive Flounder

olive flounder
Fish of Japan
Fish of Korea
Fish of East Asia
olive flounder